The British Virgin Islands Criminal Code (No 1 of 1997) is a statute of the British Virgin Islands which consolidates almost all of the indictable offences under the Territory's criminal law.

The Code was passed into law by the Legislative Council on 1 April 1997, received Royal Assent on 1 May 1997, and was brought into force on 1 September 1997.

It is sometimes mistakenly said that the Code contains all of the Territory's criminal laws, but this is not the case.  The Act expressly preserves offences under other enactments, as well as offences at common law.

Parts
After the preamble and various preliminary matters, the Act is divided into 21 parts as follows:
Part I – General rules as to criminal liability.
Part II – Punishments
Part III – Offences against Government and public order
Part IV – Offences against the administration of lawful authority
Part V – Offences relating to the administration of justice
Part VI – Offences relating to religion
Part VII – Sexual offences
Part VIII – Abortion
Part IX – Offences relating to marriage
Part X – Genocide
Part XI – Homicide and other offences against the person
Part XII – Neglect endangering life or health
Part XIII – Abduction, kidnapping and similar crimes
Part XIV – Offences relating to property
Part XV – Forgery, coining and counterfeiting
Part XVI – Personation
Part XVII – Criminal damage and similar offences
Part XVIII – Criminal libel
Part XIX – Nuisance and other offences against the public in general
Part XX – Conspiracy, attempt and assisting offenders
Part XXI – Miscellaneous

Footnotes

Criminal Code
Criminal codes